Iduna is an Austronesian language spoken on Goodenough Island of Milne Bay Province of Papua New Guinea.

Phonology

Consonants 
The inventory of the Iduna language consists of 14 consonant phonemes.

Other minor allophonic realizations may occur. Among these variations only the last one is reflected in the orthography.

Vowels 

There are five vowel phonemes in Iduna.

Vowels have allophones too. The major allophonic variations are described in the following table.

These are distinguished from vowel sequences, which instead are bimoraic, e.g. the word   'he scrapes it' contrasts with   'he unties it'.

Phonotactics 
In Iduna consonant clusters are forbidden; therefore, there are only open syllables of type V, CV and CVV. Also, the special kind of sequence CuV is generally interpreted as CʷV.

Writing system 
The Iduna alphabet is shown in the following table:

Notes

References 
 
 
 
 

Nuclear Papuan Tip languages
Languages of Milne Bay Province